The Xi'an JH-7 ( – fighter-bomber; NATO reporting name Flounder), also known as the FBC-1 (Fighter/Bomber China-1) Flying Leopard, is a tandem two-seat, twin-engine fighter-bomber in service with the People's Liberation Army Naval Air Force (PLANAF), and the People's Liberation Army Air Force (PLAAF). The main contractors are Xi'an Aircraft Industrial Corporation (XAC) and the 603rd Aircraft Design Institute (later named the First Aircraft Institute of AVIC-I).

The first JH-7s were delivered to the PLANAF in the mid-1990s for evaluation, with the improved JH-7A entering service in 2004.

Development history

A new fighter bomber
In the early 1970s, the PLAAF required a new fighter-bomber to replace the Harbin H-5 and Nanchang Q-5. A request was duly submitted to the Ministry of Aviation Industry (later renamed to the Aviation Industry Corporation of China), which organized a domestic development program when efforts to secure a joint venture with foreign partners failed. The program was authorized on 19 April 1983 by then-paramount leader Deng Xiaoping. The program was also aiming to make use of newly imported (in violation of the COCOM restrictions) British Rolls-Royce Spey turbofan engines at the time.

JH-7

The PLANAF required a similar aircraft and the program set out to develop a variant for each set of requirements. The PLAAF variant was conceived as an all-weather, long-range bomber/strike aircraft, with a two-seat, tandem cockpit, electronic countermeasures (ECM), and terrain following capabilities (similar to the General Dynamics F-111). The naval version differed in that it was conceived as a dedicated reconnaissance/strike aircraft. The PLAAF variant was dropped in the early 1980s, with the PLANAF variant becoming the JH-7.

Six prototypes were built by December 1988, and the PLANAF received 12 to 18 aircraft in the early 1990s for evaluation. The first aircraft used imported Rolls-Royce Spey Mk.202 engines, later replaced by a license-built copy, the WS-9.

The JH-7 was designed as an anti-ship fighter-bomber. As with the later JH-7A, its aerial combat capability was insignificant given the large number of specialist aircraft for that role.

JH-7A

When the PLA examined the future role of air forces, it identified a need for precision air-to-surface capability. An improved JH-7, the JH-7A, was designed to meet this requirement. The JH-7A's general and deputy general designers were Tang Changhong (唐长红) and Wu Jieqin (吴介琴) respectively.

The JH-7A had a lighter and stronger airframe than the JH-7, allowing the newer aircraft to carry a maximum ordnance load of 9,000 kg. In PLANAF, this allowed four YJ-82 anti-ship missiles to be carried, compared to the two on the JH-7.

The JH-7A is equipped with domestic Chinese helmet mounted sight (HMS) for evaluation, and this HMS currently being tested is developed by Xi'an Optronics Group (Xi Guang Ji Tuan 西光集团), a member of Northern Electro-Optic Co. Ltd (北方光电股份有限公司), the wholly owned subsidiary of Norinco, and the HMS on JH-7A was developed from the helicopter HMS manufactured by the same company, thus both share many common components. HMS tested on JH-7A is compatible with air-to-air/surface missiles, and it is also compatible with airborne sensors such as radars and electro-optics so that the sensors are slaved to HMS, enabling the fast tracking and aiming of the weaponry. The cockpit of JH-7A still retains some traditional single function dial indicators, but there are two large color liquid crystal display multi-function displays which can be monochrome if pilots choose. Other avionic upgrades of JH-7 include: replacing Type 960-2 noise jammer with BM/KJ-8605, replacing Type 265A radar altimeter with Type 271 radar altimeter, fully digitized fly-by-wire flight control system, and in addition, Type 232H airborne radar is replaced by JL-10A pulse-Doppler radar, enabling JH-7A to fire laser-guided bombs and Kh-31P anti-radiation missiles. The existing JH-7s were upgraded with JH-7A electronics. Two additional hardpoints increased the total to 6 from the original 4, and one-piece windscreen replaced the original three-piece windscreen.

The JH-7A was the first Chinese aircraft to use paperless design, and the software used was CATIA V5.

Operational history
On its maiden flight on 14 December 1988, while en route back to the airport to land, the engines of the JH-7 prototype suddenly began to vibrate violently. The test pilot Huang Bingxin (黄炳新) decided to make an emergency landing, but as he approached the airport, the vibration was so great that two thirds of the instruments had been shaken off the instrument panel, and all of the connectors of the remaining third still attached to the panel had also been shaken loose, so none of the instruments worked; the pilot nonetheless managed to eventually land the prototype safely.

On 8 June 1991, a JH-7 prototype suddenly began to leak fuel at a high rate. Lu Jun (卢军), a Russian-trained Chinese test pilot, managed to make a safe emergency landing when the fuel reserve had dropped to slightly more than 30 liters. Three years later, on 4 April 1994, a JH-7 prototype crashed during a test flight, killing Lu.

On 19 August 1992, the entire rudder of a JH-7 suddenly fell off at an altitude of 5,000 meters, while carrying four live missiles. Against orders to jettison the missiles and abandon the aircraft, the test pilot decided to attempt an emergency landing. Using mainly differential thrust of the two engines, the test pilot Huang Bingxin (黄炳新) made it back to the airport and attempted to make an emergency landing, but a tire at the starboard side burst on touch down, causing the aircraft to veer off course. Using brakes as control, the test pilot made two attempts before finally releasing the drogue parachute to finally stop safely.

The JH-7A entered service with the PLANAF in early 2004, and with the PLAAF by the end of the year.

In 2007 JH-7s went abroad to participate in "Peace Mission" exercises of the Shanghai Cooperation Organisation (SCO). In April 2012, multiple JH-7 aircraft joined a Russia-China joint naval exercise in eastern China. In 2013, JH-7s participated in a Russia–China joint exercise held on Russian territory.

On 14 October 2011, a JH-7 crashed during an exhibition at an air show in Shaanxi province, northwest China.

On 5 June 2014, a JH-7 crashed during a training mission in Yiwu, Zhejiang province.

On 22 December 2014, a JH-7 crashed near the city of Weinan in Shaanxi province, under unknown circumstances. At least two persons are said to have died in the crash.

On 22 October 2016, a JH-7 crashed in Liuzhou, Guangxi province. According to pictures released on social media, the pilots ejected.

On 12 March 2019, a JH-7 crashed during a training exercise in Ledong County, Hainan, killing two pilots on board. The crash of the normally high-altitude-usage, aged aircraft happened during a low-altitude training flight, the pilots gave up an opportunity to eject to avoid densely populated residential area and were killed when trying to avoid a school, they were hailed for their bravery as martyrs by local officials.

A new variant of the Xian JH-7 fighter-bomber is in service with the PLAAF as of August 2019. The variant is designated JH-7AII.

Operators

People's Liberation Army Naval Air Force – 120.
People's Liberation Army Air Force – 120.

Variants

 JH-7 – Initial production version of the PLANAF anti-shipping fighter-bomber.
JH-7A – Later production utilising composite structure to reduce weight, improved flying control system and improved avionics including the JL10A Shan Ying J-band pulse-Doppler radar. Weapon loads increased by the addition of two more wing hardpoints and two hardpoints under the intake trunking for mission pods such as targeting pods.
JH-7A2 – Improved variant with enhanced air-to-ground munitions and carrying capabilities. The variant was first observed in 2019. The fighter-bomber was official unveiled on Zhuhai Airshow in 2021.
JH-7E - Possibly export variant, shown at 2018 Zhuhai Airshow.
FBC-1 Flying Leopard – Export version of the JH-7.
FBC-1A Flying Leopard II – Export version of the JH-7A.

Specifications (JH-7)

See also

References

External links

 Chinese JH-7 documentary, interview with Chief Designer
 JH-7A photos and information – AirForceWorld.com
 JH-7 at SinoDefence.com
 JH-7 at GlobalSecurity.org

Aircraft first flown in 1988
1980s Chinese attack aircraft
JH-7, Xian
Twinjets
JH-7
Fourth-generation jet fighter